Camille may refer to:

Fictional entities
 a Power Rangers Jungle Fury character
 Camille Wallaby, a character in Alfred Hedgehog
 a character from League of Legends video game voiced by Emily O'Brien

Films 
Camille (1912 film), a short American film directed by Jay Hunt based on Dumas' novel La Dame aux camélias (The Lady of the Camellias)
 Camille (1915 film), an American silent film adapted by Frances Marion, directed by Albert Capellani, starring Clara Kimball Young as Camille and Paul Capellani as Armand
 Camille (1917 film), an American silent film adapted by Adrian Johnson, directed by J. Gordon Edwards, starring Theda Bara as Camille
 Camille (1921 film), an American silent film starring Alla Nazimova as Camille and Rudolph Valentino as Armand
 Camille (1926 feature film), an American silent film adapted by Fred de Gresac and company, directed by Fred Niblo, starring Norma Talmadge as Camille and Gilbert Roland as Armand
 Camille (1926 short film), an American short film by Ralph Barton, compiled from his home movies, loosely based on La Dame aux Camélias
 Camille (1936 film), an Academy Award nominated American film directed by George Cukor, starring Greta Garbo as Marguerite and Robert Taylor as Armand
 Camille (1984 film), a television film adapted by Blanche Hanalis, directed by Desmond Davis, starring Greta Scacchi as Camille and Colin Firth as Armand
 Camille (2008 film), a 2008 comedy drama film starring Sienna Miller and James Franco
 Camille 2000, an Italian film adapted by Michael DeForrest, directed by Radley Metzger, starring Danièle Gaubert as Marguerite and Nino Castelnuovo as Armand

Music 
 Camille (album), an unreleased project by the musician Prince
 La traviata, an opera by Giuseppe Verdi

Novels 
 La Dame aux Camélias, a novel by Alexandre Dumas fils, commonly known in English as Camille
 Camille (Matilda Heron Translation), an English translation of La Dame aux Camélias by Matilda Heron
 Camille (Charles Ludlam play), an American play by Charles Ludlam

People

 Camille (given name), a male or female given name
 Camilla (given name), a female given name
 Camille (French singer) (born 1978), French singer and songwriter
 Camille (American singer), born Camille Filfiley, American singer and recording artist
 Camille (Belgian singer), born Camille Dhont, Belgian singer and actress

Other uses
 Camille (ballet), a 1990 ballet by Veronica Paeper
 "Camille" (Red Dwarf), an episode from series 4 of Red Dwarf
 Hurricane Camille (1969), one of the most destructive storms to make landfall in the United States
 Camille (Monet) or The Woman in the Green Dress, an 1866 painting by Claude Monet
 Camille’s (Providence, Rhode Island) (1914) oldest Italian restaurant in Rhode Island

See also
 
Camilla (disambiguation)
Kamil
The Lady of the Camellias (disambiguation)